Matúš Užák (born 13 April 1981) is a Slovak short track speed skater. He competed at the 2002 Winter Olympics and the 2006 Winter Olympics.

References

External links
 

1981 births
Living people
Slovak male short track speed skaters
Olympic short track speed skaters of Slovakia
Short track speed skaters at the 2002 Winter Olympics
Short track speed skaters at the 2006 Winter Olympics
Sportspeople from Spišská Nová Ves